Hwang Nam-sook is a female former South Korean international table tennis player.

Table tennis career
She won a bronze medal in the women's doubles with An Hae-sook at the 1981 World Table Tennis Championships and a silver medal in the Corbillon Cup (women's team event) for South Korea.

See also
 List of table tennis players
 List of World Table Tennis Championships medalists

References

South Korean female table tennis players
Living people
World Table Tennis Championships medalists
Year of birth missing (living people)
20th-century South Korean women